Tomislav Bišćan (born 9 June 1987 in Zagreb, Croatia) is a Croatian figure skater. He is the 2002–2003 Croatian national champion.

External links
 

Croatian male single skaters
1987 births
Living people
Sportspeople from Zagreb